Sugarbread is the third EP by Soap&Skin. It was released on March 11, 2013.

Track listing
"Sugarbread" – 3:35
"Me And The Devil" (Robert Johnson cover) – 3:05
"Pray" – 2:35

References

External links
 Soap&Skin official website
 Sugarbread at spinshop.com
 Sugarbread at Amazon.com (US)
 Sugarbread at Amazon.com (UK)

Soap&Skin albums
2013 EPs